Ormars rímur is a fifteenth-century Icelandic ríma-cycle, relating how Ormarr Fraðmarsson slays the giant Bjarkmar and his uncles Gyrðr and Atli. In doing so, Ormarr avenges his father and wins a bride and kingdom.

Origins and transmission
The rímur-cycle is probably based on a lost, prose fornaldarsaga. The same material also appears in later Scandinavian ballads. It must have some literary connection to Hervarar  saga and Úlfhams rímur.

The poem survives in three medieval manuscripts, copied shortly after the poem's composition: Kollsbók, Staðarhólsbók (AM 604 d 4to), and Reykjavík, Stofnun Árna Magnússonar AM 146 a 8vo. All are thought to be independent descendants from the lost archetype. It also survives in a number of later manuscripts.

Summary
This summary is based on that of Svend Grundtvig.

Ríma I. There was a king of Gautland called Hringr. He had a daughter called Ása, as beautiful as the sun and very well brought up. In his household was a young man called Ormarr, son of the famous Fraðmarr (who fell in battle, to an unknown slayer). The young Ormarr was brought up by his mother's brother Saxi, and distinguished himself among others of his age group. One day, King Hringr sat at his table, when a giant, eighteen ells tall, entered his hall, with a club in his hand. He stands in the middle of the floor and looks around, while the court sits dumbstruck. No-one greets him or offers him a seat. Then he gives himself leave to sit on a bench, crushing three of the king's warriors. He then eats and drinks like no-one has seen before. He now greets the King, who enquires after his name and mission. "I am called Bjarkmarr", he says, "and I have come to give you a choice between two things: either to give me your daughter or to face me in a duel". The King replies, and offers his daughter to whatever of his warriors will fight this hateful troll in his stead. Everyone sits in silence for a long time, because everyone knows he is no match for the giant. Then Bjarkmarr replies and says "yes, so I had better choose the King over all the other Gautar". At this point, Ormarr, who had been sitting sorrowfully at the exchange, can no longer restrain himself and leaps across the King's table, shouting "I have intended that beautiful maiden for myself, and you, Bjarkmar, will lose your life by my sword and be food for dogs and ravens". The giant is angered by this speech, but restrains himself until the next day, when the duel is to take place.

Ríma II. After nightfall, while everyone else is asleep, Ormarr walks out to the headland where his father's burial mound lies and says "wake up, father, and talk with your son!" He asks twice, to no avail, and then threatens his father, at which point the earth shakes and the stones break, and Ormarr sees his dead father standing before him, sword in hand. "I have lain long in my mound, far from people", says the corpse, "and no warrior was so bold that he wished to fight me". Ormarr replies "a fiend has come into the country, and I must win myself a bride. Therefore, would you now give me your good sword?" "That's a feeble request", says the corpse: "you already have plenty of new swords which you can use." Ormarr replies: "if you don't give me the sword, I'll break into the burial mound and get it myself. I'm not unwilling to, but it would be a shame if I had to." The corpse replies: "no better sword will you find above ground, but even the best weapon won't save a man who is fated to die. I was killed in battle, and you can't have the sword unless you promise to avenge my death". "I'll do that", says Ormarr, "as true as I live, unless I die trying; but you'll have to tell me who killed you." "It was the two uncles of the giant Bjarkmarr, whom you now have to deal with", says the corpse; "eleven strong warriors attacked me at once; nine fell to my sword, but Gyrðr and Atli gave me a mortal wound. So take the sword, my son and heir. Warriors called my sword Birtingr; now it is yours; I often bore it, bloody, from the slaughter. Nowhere will you find a better sword; that blue blade is so sharp that no-one can defend themselves against it." Ormarr joyfully thanks his father, who gives him his blessing in return, and Ormar returns to the court.

Ríma III. Next morning, Ormarr prepares for battle. The King's daughter is very afraid because he must fight the giant, and everyone feels that he is all too young for the fearsome battle. The river-island where the duel must take place is hard by the King's castle. Ormarr is the first on the scene, but the giant soon arrives with noise and howling that makes the sky and land shake, stomping so hard that he sinks up to his knee in the earth with each step. Ormarr is ready; the giant saws the air with his club; Ormarr hews at him with Birtingr and cuts off both legs, killing him. Now young Ormarr returns to the castle and greets the King and receives Ása, who is now his bride. He does not wish to rest, however, because he wants to avenge his father. The King gives him a dragonship along with a fleet of one hundred. He sails out, while his bride stands weeping on the shore. Ormarr has a fair breeze until he sees a small island ahead. He finds a battle-fleet at anchor, and asks who leads it. He is told the captains are two brothers, never before defeated in battle, named Gyrðr and Atli. "But who captains this warship, which comes sailing here?", asks Ormarr's interlocutor, and he says: "Ormarr the young, the slayer of Bjarkmarr". The brothers are swiftly informed, and ask him what he will pay by way of reparations for their nephew Bjarkmarr — either he can give them goods and money and his betrothed and go in peace, or they can kill him and take these anyway. Ormarr despatches the emissary, saying "you will have misfortune if you persist in this errand. Say to the brothers that I will soon be with them to test their strength." The messenger brings the brothers this answer, adding that after they have seen Ormarr and his army, they will be worried about the outcome.

Ríma IV. The next morning, both armies land on the island, and attack each other. Then the brothers recognise Birtingr in Ormarr's hand and ask where he got the sword. "My father gave it to me", says Ormarr; "eleven people attacked him when he was slain; it was a dastardly act, and I will now avenge it." So begins the battle; the brothers make headway into Ormarr's army and fell many men. There is so much dust that no-one can see the sky, and blood comes up to the knee. But, with Birtingr, Ormarr is able to slay everyone, and in the end he fells both Gyrðr and Atli, splitting the former vertically and the latter horizontally. After their death he allows the rest of the army to live, has the wounded from both sides bandaged, and heads back to Gautland with his plunder. The King meets him on the beach and leads him home to the hall, where they drink the wedding feast with great joy. Ormarr and his princess live long and happily together; Ormarr inherits the kingdom when King Hringr dies; his two sons, Saxi and Fróðmarr, become powerful warriors; and Fóðmarr inherits Birtingr from his father.

Sample 
The following sample is from the dialogue between Ormarr and his dead father, Hringr, from ríma II. The passage corresponds to the famous poem Hervararkviða in Heiðreks saga, a probable source for Ormars rímur, in which Hervör asks her dead father Angantýr for the sword Tyrfingr.

Editions
 Haukur Þorgeirsson, 'Hljóðkerfi og bragkerfi: Stoðhljóð, tónkvæði og önnur úrlausnarefni í íslenskri bragsögu ásamt útgáfu á Rímum af Ormari Fraðmarssyn' (Ph.D. thesis, University of Iceland, 2013), pp. 279-318 (diplomatic transcription of Kollsbók); 319-43 (normalised, critical edition).

External links

 Entry in Bragi, the Icelandic poetry database.

References

Legendary sagas
Rímur